USS Ranger was a 14-gun brigantine that served in the U.S. Navy from 1814 to 1821.

Ranger was purchased on Lake Ontario in 1814 for duty with Commodore Isaac Chauncey's squadron in the War of 1812, serving as a transport or supply vessel. She was condemned as being unfit for repairs or further service, and was sold 15 May 1821.

References

Age of Sail naval ships of the United States
War of 1812 ships of the United States
 Ranger (Ontario)
1814 ships